Kendrew is a surname. Notable people with the surname include:

Douglas Kendrew (1910–1989), British Army officer, rugby player and politician
John Kendrew (inventor) (1748-1800), British inventor
Norman Kendrew (1908–1966), British cricketer
Peter Kendrew (born 1940), British competition swimmer